Country Air (Italian:Aria di paese) is a 1933 Italian comedy film directed by Eugenio de Liguoro and starring Erminio Macario, Laura Adani and Evangelina Vitaliani. It marked the debut of Macario. An unemployed drifter takes a series of jobs, each one of which he quickly loses. He then goes to the countryside for a while where he falls in love with a woman.

Cast
 Erminio Macario as il vagabondo
Laura Adani as Maria
Ernesto Maroni as Antonio
Mario Siletti as custode
Umberto Sacripante
Evangelina Vitaliani as zia di Maria
Lisalotte Smith

References

Bibliography 
 Moliterno, Gino. Historical Dictionary of Italian Cinema. Scarecrow Press, 2008.

External links 

1933 films
Italian comedy films
1933 comedy films
1930s Italian-language films
Films directed by Eugenio de Liguoro
Italian black-and-white films
Films shot at Tirrenia Studios
1930s Italian films